The Llanbeblig Book of Hours is an illuminated manuscript in the National Library of Wales (NLW MS 17520A) that dates from the close of the fourteenth century. Entries in the Calendar link the Llanbeblig Hours to Wales, and more specifically the dedication of the church of Saint Peblig, which is marked June 6th, connects it with Caernarfon. 

A rare Lily Crucifixion motif is one of the seven illuminated miniatures in this Book of Hours. The Lily Crucifixion miniature is discussed in the context of other examples of the motif in devotional iconography in an NLW journal article by Eddie Duggan. Even though neither the miniatures nor the decorated borders and initial letters are of any great artistic merit, this manuscript is of interest as it is one of the few examples of an illuminated manuscript that is linked to Wales.

Binding 

The early sixteenth century gold-tooled calf covers of the Llanbeblig Hours, which both bear the arms of King Henry VIII and Katherine of Aragon in shields separated by two roses, are inlaid in the nineteenth century binding. The binding was thus executed before the 1532 annulment of King Henry's marriage to Katherine of Aragon.

Full-page miniatures

References

Illuminated manuscripts of Welsh origin
Welsh manuscripts
15th-century illuminated manuscripts
National Library of Wales collections